The 1955 Formula One season was the ninth season of FIA Formula One motor racing. It featured the 1955 World Championship of Drivers, which commenced on 16 January 1955 and ended on 11 September after seven races. Juan Manuel Fangio won his second consecutive World Championship title in a season curtailed by tragedies.

The season also included several non-championship Formula One races.

Season summary
Mercedes drivers again dominated the championship, with Fangio taking four races and his new teammate Stirling Moss winning the British Grand Prix. Ferrari won at Monaco after all of the Mercedes cars broke down and Lancia driver Alberto Ascari crashed into the harbour. Although Ascari was apparently unscathed, the double World Champion crashed fatally at Monza while testing sportscars four days later.

The disaster at the 24 Hours of Le Mans on 11 June, which killed Pierre Levegh and over 80 spectators, led to the cancellations of the French, German, Spanish, and Swiss Grands Prix. The French round, which was supposed to be held at Reims between the Dutch and British rounds, on 3 July, was first rescheduled to 25 September and subsequently cancelled. Then the German event, scheduled for 31 July at the Nürburgring, the Swiss round at Bremgarten, planned to take place on 21 August, and the Spanish round on 23 October at Pedralbes, followed suit. Pedralbes and Bremgarten were then abandoned and never used again for racing; motor racing was banned altogether in Switzerland, and no circuit race was held in Switzerland until the 2018 Zürich ePrix. These cancellations effectively handed the Drivers' title to Fangio after he finished 2nd to Moss at the British Grand Prix. However, he was not crowned champion until well after the British Grand Prix because the German, Swiss and Spanish rounds were cancelled after the British Grand Prix took place.

The 1955 season would be the final for Mercedes Benz as a constructor until the team's revival in 2010. It would also mark the final win for Mercedes until the 2012 Chinese Grand Prix.

Aside from Ascari's death this year, Italian Mario Alborghetti died at the non-championship Pau Grand Prix in France driving a Maserati and two drivers were killed in the Indy 500, Manny Ayulo in practice, and previous race winner Bill Vukovich during the race two weeks later.

Season review

  The Indianapolis 500 was AAA-sanctioned and not run to Formula One regulations. It also counted towards the 1955 AAA Championship.

Teams and drivers
The following teams and drivers competed in the 1955 FIA World Championship.

World Championship of Drivers standings

Championship points were awarded on an 8–6–4–3–2 basis for the first five places at each race. One point was awarded for the fastest race lap at each race. Only the best five results counted towards the championship. Numbers without parentheses are Championship points; numbers in parentheses are total points scored.

 Italics indicates the fastest lap (1 point awarded – point shared equally between drivers sharing fastest lap)
 Bold indicates pole position
 † = Car driven by more than one driver

Non-championship races
Other Formula One races were also held in 1955, which did not count towards the World Championship.

Notes

Formula One seasons